Abiological nitrogen fixation describes chemical processes that fix (react with) N2, usually with the goal of generating ammonia. The dominant technology for abiological nitrogen fixation is the Haber process, which uses an iron-based heterogeneous catalysts and H2 to convert N2 to NH3. This article focuses on homogeneous (soluble) catalysts for the same or similar conversions.

Transition metals

Vol'pin and Shur
An early influential discovery of abiological nitrogen fixation was made by Vol'pin and co-workers in Russia in 1970. Aspects are described in an early review:
"using a non-protic Lewis acid, aluminium tribromide, were able to demonstrate the truly catalytic effect of titanium by treating dinitrogen with a mixture of titanium tetrachloride, metallic aluminium, and aluminium tribromide at 50 °C, either in the absence or in the presence of a solvent, e.g. benzene.

Mo- and Fe-based systems
Because Mo and Fe are found at the active site of the most common and most active form of nitrogenase, these metals have been the focus of particular attention for homogeneous catalysis.  Most catalytic systems operate according to the following stoichiometry:
N2  + 6H+  +  6e−  →  2NH3

The reductive protonation of metal dinitrogen complexes was popularized by Chatt and coworkers, using Mo(N2)2(dppe)2 as substrate.  Treatment of this complex with acid gave substantial amounts of ammonium. This work revealed the existence of several intermediates, including hydrazido complexes (Mo=N-NH2). Catalysis was not demonstrated. Schrock developed a related system based on the amido Mo(III) ocomplex Mo[(HIPTN)3N].  With this complex, catalytic nitrogen fixation occurred, albeit with only a few turnovers.

Intense effort has focussed on family of pincer ligand-supported Mo(0)-N2 complexes. In terms of it donor set, and oxidation state, these pincer complexes are similar to Chatt's complexes.  Their advantage is that they catalyze the hydrogenation of dinitrogen.  A Mo-PCP (PCP = phosphine-[[NHC]-phosphine]] complex exhibits >1000 turnovers when the reducing agent is samarium(II) iodide and the proton source is methanol.

Iron complexes of N2 are numerous. Derivatives of Fe(0) with C3-symmetric ligands catalyze nitrogen fixation.

Photolytic routes
Photolytic nitrogen splitting is also considered.

p-Block systems
Although nitrogen fixation is usually associated with transition metal complexes, a boron-based system has been described.  One molecule of dinitrogen is bound by two transient Lewis-base-stabilized borylene species. The resulting dianion was subsequently oxidized to a neutral compound, and reduced using water.

Nitriding
In rare cases, metals react with nitrogen gas to give nitrides, a process called nitriding. For example, metallic lithium burns in an atmosphere of nitrogen, giving lithium nitride. Hydrolysis of the resulting nitride gives ammonia. In a related process, trimethylsilyl chloride, lithium and nitrogen react in the presence of a catalyst to give tris(trimethylsilyl)amine, which can be further elaborated. Processes involving lithium metal are however of little practical interest since they are non-catalytic and re-reducing the  ion residue is difficult.

Some Mo(III) complexes also cleave N2:
2Mo(NR2)3  +  N2  →  2N≡Mo(NR2)3
This and related terminal nitrido complexes have been used to make nitriles.

See also 
 Nitrogenase: enzymes used by organisms to fix nitrogen
Transition metal dinitrogen complex
Metal nitrido complex

References

Homogeneous catalysis